Nurkhon Yuldashkhojayeva (often anglicized as Nurkhon Yuldasheva) was one of the first Uzbek women to dance onstage without a paranja veil. She was born in 1913 in Margilan, a city in Fergana Province and was murdered in an honor killing in 1929.

Honor killing 
Nurkhon ran away from home at a young age to join a Russian dance troupe. Her colleagues there included the future People's Artist of the USSR Tamara Khanum and the future People’s Artist of Uzbekistan Gavkhar Rakhimova. Shortly after joining the group, on 8 March 1928 she and another dancer went onstage and publicly removed their face-veils. When the dance troupe was visiting her hometown of Margilan she decided to visit her family. Her aunt brought her into the house, and told her that her brother was looking for her. He then stabbed her to death, and immediately confessed to the crime after police arrived at the scene. He had admitted that the murder was premeditated, at the insistence of their father, the ming-boshi and mullah Kamal G'iasov, who made him swear on the Koran to kill her. The day after her death a massive funeral was held in the public square. Thousands of people attended the memorial, and women threw off their face-veils in front of her coffin. Her father and brother were eventually tried and executed for their role in the murder, and the ming-boshi and mullah were exiled.

Aftermath 
After her death she was honored by the authorities of the USSR as a courageous Soviet role model and martyr, similar to that of Tursunoy Saidazimova. A statue of Nurkhon was built and placed in Margilan in front of the House of Culture. Made by sculptor Valentin Klebansov in 1967, Nurkhon's statue was taken down in 1993 shortly after the disestablishment of the Uzbek Soviet Socialist Republic in 1991; A monument to a young woman representing the struggle for feminine emancipation was considered immoral in post-Soviet Uzbekistan. In the city of Ferghana there is a cinema that still bears her name though, the "Nurkhon" cinema.

Nurkhon became the heroine of a Soviet musical play by Kamil Yashin popular throughout the mid 20th century.

See also
Tursunoy Saidazimova
Tamara Khanum
Honor killing
Emancipation of women
Hujum

References

1913 births
1929 deaths
People from Margilan
Propaganda in the Soviet Union
Honor killing victims
Uzbekistani feminists
Uzbekistani murder victims
People killed in the Hujum
Uzbeks
20th-century Uzbekistani artists
Honor killing in Asia
Deaths by stabbing
Sororicides